Cephalotaxus wilsoniana is a species of coniferous tree in the yew family, Taxaceae. Its common names include Taiwan plum yew, Taiwan cow's-tail pine, and Wilson plum yew. It is endemic to Taiwan, scattered in montane forests at altitudes of 1400-2700 meters. Cephalotaxus wilsoniana is mostly dioecious, because it's scattered with broad-leaved trees, the fecundity is not strong. In addition, the seed maturity period is very long. Germination and growth are also slow. Therefore, Cephalotaxus wilsoniana is not a common tree species in Taiwan.

This taxon is sometimes considered to be a variety of Cephalotaxus harringtonii.

This conifer grows up to 9 meters tall with drooping branches and reddish brown flaky bark. It grows in scattered populations in the woodlands of Taiwan. It is sometimes cultivated in local gardens.

The wood of Cephalotaxus wilsoniana is light yellowish brown with dense structure and excellent quality, which can be used for construction, furniture, agricultural appliances. A variety of plant alkaloids can be extracted from leaves, branches, roots and seeds.

References

wilsoniana
Endemic flora of Taiwan
Trees of Taiwan
Taxa named by Bunzō Hayata